"I Guess You Had to Be There" is a song written by Jon Robbin and Barbara Cloyd, and recorded by American country music artist Lorrie Morgan.  It was released in February 1993 as the third single from her album Watch Me.  The song reached number 14 on the Billboard Hot Country Singles & Tracks chart in July 1993.

Chart performance

References

1993 singles
1992 songs
Lorrie Morgan songs
BNA Records singles
Music videos directed by Sherman Halsey
Song recordings produced by Richard Landis